Alex Lloyd (born 19 November 1974) is an Australian singer-songwriter. Four of his albums, Black the Sun, Watching Angels Mend, Distant Light and Alex Lloyd, released between 1999 and 2005, made the top ten on the ARIA charts. Lloyd has also won the ARIA Award for Best Male Artist on three occasions.

Early life and education
Alexander Wasiliev was born to a father of Russian descent and a mother of Irish descent. Lloyd grew up in the inner Sydney suburb of Balmain, New South Wales, and attended Balmain High School (now Sydney Secondary College Balmain Campus).

At the age of 15, Lloyd was a member of a school rock band that won the 1990 Balmain Battle of the Bands. This mainly blues-rock band evolved into "The Beefs", which began playing in local pubs and clubs and into indie rock band Mother Hubbard. Lloyd adopted his mother's maiden name 'Lloyd', following her unexpected death in 1991.

Career

1998–2002: Black the Sun and Watching Angels Mend
Early in 1998, Lloyd released his debut single "Peepshow/Momo", which did not chart. In July 1998, Lloyd released the single "Black the Sun", the lead from his debut album of the same name. The song peaked at number 86 on the ARIA Charts. Lloyd's debut studio album, Black the Sun was released in July 1999. It peaked at number 9 on the ARIA Charts and was certified 2× Platinum. Triple J listeners voting it their album of the year in 1999. At the ARIA Music Awards of 2000, Lloyd won ARIA Award for Best Male Artist.

In 2001, Lloyd released "Downtown" and "Amazing", the lead singles from his second album. "Amazing" became his best performing single, peaking within the top 20 in Australia and being certified gold. It was voted in a number 1 on the Triple J Hottest 100, 2001. At the APRA Music Awards of 2002, the song won Single of the Year. Watching Angels Mend was released in September 2001 and peaked at number 2 in Australia and was certified 3× platinum. Two further top-40 singles in Australia followed in 2002: "Green" and "Everybody's Laughing". At the ARIA Music Awards of 2002, Lloyd was nominated for seven awards, winning ARIA Award for Best Male Artist for a second time.

2003–2004: Distant Light, Alex Lloyd and Amazing: The Best of Alex Lloyd
In August 2003, Lloyd released "Coming Home", the lead single from his third studio album. The song peaked at number 24 on the ARIA Charts. At the ARIA Music Awards of 2003, the song won Lloyd the vARIA Award for Best Male Artist for a third time.

Lloyd's third studio album Distant Light was released in September 2003. The album peaked at number 9 on the ARIA Charts and was certified gold. It spawned two more top 50 singles in "1000 Miles" and "Beautiful".

In August 2005, Alex Lloyd released "Never Meant to Fail", the lead single from his fourth studio album. The song reached the top 30 in Australia. On 25 October 2005, Lloyd released his self-titled fourth studio album. The album peaked at number 7 on the ARIA Charts and was certified platinum. In April 2006, Lloyd performed in the grand finale of Dancing with the Stars, singing his breakthrough song, "Amazing". His performance on the show saw the album re-entered the albums charts.

In September 2006, Lloyd released his first greatest hits album, titled Amazing: The Best of Alex Lloyd. It was his final on EMI Music. A limited edition of the album features a second album of B-sides and rarities and it peaked at number 34.

2008–2011: Good in the Face of a Stranger and the Mad Bastards Trio
In November 2008, Lloyd released his fifth studio album Good in the Face of a Stranger through Inertia. The album peaked at number 80 on the ARIA Chart. The album spawned two singles, the first, "Slow Train" featured a video clip made with 7,000 hand-drawn pictures. The album's second single, "What We Started", was released in March 2009 and subsequently used as song on the television show 90210.

In 2011, Lloyd began touring with Steve and Alan Pigram from the Pigram Brothers. The trio had worked on the soundtrack for the Australian film Mad Bastards, and subsequently became known as the Mad Bastards Trio, using the tour to promote the film, which was released on 5 May 2011. The tour ended later that month. The Mad Bastards Trio also performed on Adam Hills in Gordon Street Tonight and also had an interview with George Negus about the music and the film itself. One of Lloyd's songs from Good in the Face of a Stranger, "Slow Train" made it onto the soundtrack, along with songs written by the Pigram Brothers, but the majority of the soundtrack was written as a collaboration between the trio. At the APRA Music Awards of 2011 the trio received three nominations. At the ARIA Music Awards of 2011, the album was nominated for Best Original Soundtrack/Cast/Show Album.

2012–2015: Urban Wilderness and "Coming Home (To Richmond)"
In March 2013, Lloyd began road-testing new songs on a limited tour. Speaking to The Newcastle Herald, Lloyd announced the title of the album as Urban Wilderness. In August 2013, Lloyd released the first single from the album, "Better The Less You Know," featuring footage of people listening to the song in London and on the Central Coast. The album was released on 18 October 2013, and was met with a mostly positive reception. Late in 2013, Lloyd performed his first Australian tour in over five years.

In 2014, Lloyd collaborated with the Richmond Football Club, releasing "Coming Home (To Richmond)"; a combination of his original 2003 single with references made to the AFL club. Lloyd subsequently adopted the Tigers as his club. The song became his first re-entry into the Australia Top 100 in over eight years, peaking at number 62 on the ARIA Charts.

A third single from Urban Wilderness was released in April 2014, titled "Good Thing".

2016–2017: Acoustica
On 11 February 2016, Liberation Music announced that Lloyd will be releasing an acoustic album as part of their acoustic series, featuring re-imaginings of many of his most successful tracks. The following day, an acoustic version of "Coming Home" was released on their YouTube channel. Lloyd also began touring with Australian rock band Icehouse for their tour dates in Newcastle, Sydney, Melbourne and Canberra throughout February and March 2016.

Acoustica was released on 5 August 2016 and peaked at number 45 on ARIA charts.

2018–2019: Black the Sun 20th Anniversary Tour
Following an appearance at A Day on the Green in 2018 and supporting The Whitlams on their national tour of 2018, Lloyd announced a 20th-anniversary release of his debut album Black the Sun. The subsequent national tour, took place from October–November and was a success, with multiple sell out shows.

2021–present: "Amazing" 20th Anniversary Tour and new album 
Following the reopening of venues during the COVID-19 pandemic, Lloyd announced an eleven date acoustic tour the celebrate the 20th anniversary release of "Amazing".

In May 2022, Lloyd released his first single in eight years, "Trojan Horse", coinciding with the commencement of the tour.

Personal life
Lloyd is married to Amelia Wasiliev and they have three sons and one daughter: Jake, Isaac, Elvis and Belle.

Discography

Albums

Soundtrack albums

Compilation albums

Extended plays

Singles

Awards and nominations

ARIA Awards
The ARIA Music Awards are a set of annual ceremonies presented by Australian Recording Industry Association (ARIA), which recognise excellence, innovation, and achievement across all genres of the music of Australia. They commenced in 1987. Lloyd has won four awards.

APRA Awards
The APRA Awards are several award ceremonies run in Australia by the Australasian Performing Right Association (APRA) to recognise composing and song writing skills, sales and airplay performance by its members annually.

References

External links

http://www.madbastards.com.au

1974 births
Living people
APRA Award winners
ARIA Award winners
Australian people of Irish descent
Australian people of Russian descent
Australian singer-songwriters
Musicians from Sydney
21st-century Australian singers